The Long Hollow Fire was a wildfire burning five miles south of Dufur, Oregon in the United States. The fire was first reported on July 26, 2018 and has burned  .The fire was started by farm equipment. The fire is located just south of the Substation Fire. It is the third major fire of the 2018 Oregon wildfire season.

Events

July

The Long Hollow Fire was first reported on July 26, 2018, at 4:45 pm in a field southeast of Dufur, Oregon. The fire was started by farm equipment. Dry temperatures and strong winds led to the fire's rapid growth by evening into the canyon of the Deschutes River. A portion of the river and Highway 216 were closed as a result. On July 28, crews focused on targeting the fire in Jones Canyon. 
Despite the growth, containment lines were improved and by morning containment was 27 percent. Highway 216 and river access were made available again. 

The next morning, July 30, the fire was over half contained, with the fire showing little growth despite warm temperatures. As of July 31, the Long Hollow Fire had burned  and was 95 percent contained.

Impact

The fire has impacted recreational activities along the Deschutes River. A segment of the river was closed for three days due to the fire's location in the river's canyon.

References

External links

 

2018 Oregon wildfires
July 2018 events in the United States
August 2018 events in the United States